Scottville is a village in Macoupin County, Illinois, United States. The population was 93 at the 2020 census.

Geography
Scottville is located in northwestern Macoupin County at  (39.479021, -90.103494).

Headwaters of Rock Branch flow through the village, leading northwest to Apple Creek, a west-flowing tributary of the Illinois River.

Demographics

As of the census of 2000, there were 140 people, 57 households, and 42 families residing in the village. The racial makeup of the village was 100.00% White.

There were 57 households, out of which 29.8% had children under the age of 18 living with them, 56.1% were married couples living together, 10.5% had a female householder with no husband present, and 26.3% were non-families. 22.8% of all households were made up of individuals, and 10.5% had someone living alone who was 65 years of age or older. The average household size was 2.46 and the average family size was 2.88.

In the village, the population was spread out, with 25.7% under the age of 18, 4.3% from 18 to 24, 26.4% from 25 to 44, 24.3% from 45 to 64, and 19.3% who were 65 years of age or older. The median age was 41 years. For every 100 females, there were 97.2 males. For every 100 females age 18 and over, there were 89.1 males.

The median income for a household in the village was $31,875, and the median income for a family was $30,833. Males had a median income of $35,625 versus $22,083 for females. The per capita income for the village was $14,362. There were 14.3% of families and 17.5% of the population living below the poverty line, including 25.7% of under eighteens and 20.0% of those over 64.

References

Villages in Macoupin County, Illinois
Villages in Illinois